K. N. Jagannatha Varma (1 May 1939 – 20 December 2016) was an Indian actor who worked in Malayalam film and television industry. He was also a Kathakali artist. His son Manu Varma is also an artist and his son-in-law Viji Thampi is a film director. He acted in a number of Malayalam movies performing stereotypical roles of a senior police officer, judge or a priest. Some of his noted roles were in movies New Delhi (1987), Thanthram (1988),  Lelam (1997) and Pathram (1999),  all directed by Joshiy.
Varma joined the Kerala Police Force in 1963, before getting active in movies. He retired from the Kerala Police as the Superintendent of Police.

Family

He was born as third among five children to Thekkedathu Kovilakam Kerala Varma Thampuran and Kattunkal Kovilakam Ambalika at Varanad, Cherthala, Kerala. 
Malayalam movie director Viji Thampi is his Son-in-law.

His last film was 'Dolls', released in 2013. His last TV serial was 'Mangalyapattu', which was being aired in Mazhavil Manorama channel at the time of his death. He was cremated with full state honours at his family crematorium in Cherthala.

Filmography 

  The Lovers
 Pava (2016) as Bishop
  Kidney Biriyani (2015)
  Dolls (2013)
  Rebecca Uthup Kizhakkemala as Bishop
  Ashuravithu (2012)
  Happy Durbar (2011)
  Christian Brothers (2011) as Bishop
  Aakaasha Yathra (2010)
  Ringtone (2010)
  Rhythm (2010)
  Kausthubham (2010)
  Thanthonni  (2010)
  Red Chillies (2009)
  Pathaam Adhyaayam (2009)
  College Kumaran (2008) as Judge
  Twenty:20 (2008) as Judge
  Novel (2008) as Vishwanatha Menon 
  Inspector Garud (2007) as Police officer
  Detective (2007)
  Aayurrekha (2007) as Nambiar
  Bada Dosth (2006) as I.G.
  Chess (2006 film) (2006) as D.I.G
  Lion (2006) as DGP
  Ashwaaroodan (2006) as Mankoyyikkal Vasukuruppu
  Highway Police (2006) as Chandrasekharan Mashu
  Deepangal Sakshi (2005) as M. K. Menon
  Udayam (2004)
  Mr. Brahmachari (2003)
  Soudaamini (2003)
  Nandanam (2002)
  Pakalppooram (2002)
  The Gift of God (2002)
  Njan Rajavu (2002)
  Praja (2001) as Mannel Mamachan
  Swargavaathil (2001)
  Naaranathu Thamburan (2001)
  Sraavu (2001)
  Laya Thaalangal (2001)
  Jeevan Masai (2001)
  The Warrant (2000) as IG
  Narashimham (2000)
  Unnimaaya (2000)
  Mark Antony (2000) as Bishop
  Crime File (1999) as Bishop Punnassery
  Ezhupunna Tharakan (1999) as Priest
  Panchapandavar (1999) as Thirumeni
  Pathram (1999) as Pattathil Outhakkutty
  Udayapuram Sulthan (1999) as Thirumangalathu Nampoothiri
  Vazhunnor (1999) as Kuriakose
  Mailpeelikkavu (1998)
  Poothiruvathira Raavil (1998)
  Aaram Thamburan (1997) as Cheriya achan
  Snehadooth(1997)
  Lelam (1997) as Bishop
  Poomarathanalil (1997)
  Kathapurushan (1996) as Kunjunni's Father
  The Prince (1996/II) as Guru Murthy Shasthri
  Kaliveedu (1996) as Menon
  Moonilonnu (1996) as Nambyar
  Rajaputhran (1996) as Chief Minister
  Sallapam (1996) as Prabhakara Varma
  19 April (1996)
  Kireedamillaatha Raajakkanmaar(1996) as Caltran Nicholas
  Raajaputhran (1996)
  Boxer(1995) as Madhavan Nair
  Chief Minister K R Gouthami (1994)
  Kambolam (1994) as Narayana Iyyer
  Moonnilonnu (1994)
  Parinayam (1994) as Palakkunnam
  Bhaarya (1994)
  Aagneyam (1993)
  Devasuram (1993) as Adiyodi
  Janam (1993) as Fernandez
  Journalist (1993) as Kaimal
  City Police (1993) as C.M. Vasudeva Panikar
  Vietnam Colony (1993) as Company MD
  Pandu Pandoru Rajakumari (1992) as Thampuran
  Sargam (1992) as Maash
  Kizhakkan Pathrose (1992)
  Kunukkitta Kozhi (1992)
  Radhachakram (1992)
  Sabarimalayil Thanka Sooryodayam(1992)
  Mahaanagaram (1992)
  Kingini (1992)
  Sooryachakram (1992)
  Thalastaanam (1992) as College Principal
  Yoddha (1992) as Raghava Menon
  Neelagiri (1991) as Varma
  Advaitham (1991) as Sreedharan
  Bhoomika (1991) as Superintendent of Police
  Chanchattam (1991) as Company M. D.
  Gaanamela (1991)
  Aanavaal Mothiram (1991)
   Nattuvishesham(1991) as Madhava Menon
  Nagarathil Samsara Vishayam (1991) as Achutha Menon
  Souhrudam (1991)
  Chakravarthy (1991) as Augustine Joseph
  Venal Kinavukal (1991) as Krishna Kurup
  Ee Thanutha Veluppan Kalathu (1990) as I. G.
  Kuttettan (1990) as Narayanan
  Samrajyam (1990) as K. M. Shah
  Mathilukal (1990)
  Midhya (1990) as Krishna Kurup
  Kottayam Kunjachan (1990) as B. Ramanatha Reddiar
  ??? (1990) as Kurisinkal Kariyachan
  Naale Ennundenkil (1990)
  Maanmizhiyaal (1990)
  No:20 Madras mail (1990)
  Aanaval Mothiram (1990) as Karthikeyan
  Arhatha (1990) as C. K. Ramakrishnan
  Ee Kannikoodi (1990) as Police Officer
  Kattukuthira (1990)
  Varthamankalam(1990) as Arundathi's Father
  Randam Varavu (1990) as Judge
  Veena Meettiya Vilangukal (1990)
  Nammude Naadu (1990)
  Mrigaya (1989)
  Anagha (1989) as Raghavan Nair
  Nair Saab (1989)
  Kodungallur Bagavathi (1989)
  Kaalalpada (1989)
  Annakutty Kodambakkam Vilikkunnu(1989) as C V Chandran
  Antharjanam (1989)...Thirumeni
  Jeevitham Oru Raagam (1989)
  Jagratha (1989) as aka "CBI Diary Part II" - India (English title)
  Ardham (1989) as Warrier
  Aksharathettu (1989)
  Adharvam (1989) as Moothedan
  Naaduvazhikal (1989) as Dy.S.P. Pavithran
  Mukthi (1988) as Viswanathan Nair
  Thanthram (1988) as Kurien Joseph
  Nineteen Twenty One (1988)
  Marikkunnilla njaan (1988)
  1921 (1988)
  Ormayil Ennum (1988)
  Aalilakkuruvikal (1988)
  Oru CBI Diary Kurippu (1988) as S. P
  Dhinarathrangal (1988) as Madhava Menon's Brother-in-law
  Aaranyakam (1988) as Madhavan Nair
  New Delhi (1987) as C. R. Panikkar
  Adimakal Udamakal (1987) as R. K. Shenoy
  Achuvettante Veedu (1987) as Varma
  Manja Manthrangal (1987)
  Vrutham (1987) as Subrahmanya Iyer
  Naalkkavala (1987)
  Aalippazhangal (1987)
  Athinumappuram (1987)
  Ajantha (1987)
  Theekattu (1987) as Radha's father
  Varshangal Poyathariyathe (1987)
  Kaiyethum Doorathu (1987) as Chandra Shekhara Kuruppu
  Aavanazhi (1986) as Kumar
  Nandi Veendum Varika (1986)
  Sughamo Devi (1986) as Devi's Father
  Nimishangal (1986) as Rajapadmanabhan Thampi
  Koodanayum Kattu (1986)
  Shobaraj (1986)
  Yuvajanotsavam (1986) as SP Dharmapalan
  Nakhakshathangal (1986)
  Musafir (Hindi, 1986) as Jabbar Patel
  Karimpinpoovinakkare (1985) as Advocate
  Ayanam (1985) as Alice's Father
  Ee Sabdam Innathe Sabdam (1985) as Police Officer
  Anu Bandham (1985) as Bhaskaran's Father
  Vasantha Sena (1985)
  Idanilangal (1985) 
  Oru Naal Innorunaal (1985)
  Avidatheppole Ivideyum (1985)
  Rangam (1985)
  Shree Krishnaparanthu (1984) as Pappu
  Thirakal (1984)
  Swarna Gopuram(1984) as Mercy's father
  Ethirppukal (1984)
  Pavam Krooran(1984)
  Unaroo (1984)
 Kurishuyudham (1984) as D.I.G
  Krishna Guruvayoorappa(1984) as Kunju Nair
  Oru Sumangaliyude Kadha (1984) as Doctor
  Pallankuzhi (1983) as Karthavu
  Marakkillorikkalum (1983) as Kesavan Nampoothiri
  Mortuary (1983/II) as College Principal
  Rugma (1983) as Narayana Menon
  Kelkatha Shabdam (1982) as Babu's Father
  Sara Varsham (1982) as Ramakrishnan Nair
  Kakka (1982)
  Thuranna Jail  (1982) as Venukuttan
  Amritha Geetham (1982)
  Raktham (1981) as George
  Arayannam (1981) as Sekharan 
  Swarangal Swapnagal (1981) as Dr Mohan
  Swarna Pakshikal (1981)
  Asthamikkatha Pakalukal (1981) as Psychiatrist
  Chaakara (1980) as Police Officer
  Prakrithi Manohari (1980) as Achuthan Pilla
  Anthappuram (1980)
  Kannukal (1979) as Menon
  Nakshathrangale Sakshi (1979)
  Aalmarattam  (1978)
  Mattoly '' (1978)

Television

References

External links

Jagannatha Varma at MSI

1939 births
2016 deaths
Male actors from Kerala
Male actors in Malayalam cinema
Indian male film actors
Kathakali exponents
Indian male dancers
Dancers from Kerala
People from Alappuzha district
20th-century Indian dancers
20th-century Indian male actors
Male actors in Malayalam television
Indian male television actors
Indian police officers
21st-century Indian male actors